Mossynea was a town of ancient Bithynia, inhabited in Roman times. The name does not occur among ancient authors but is inferred from epigraphic and other evidence.

Its site is located near Urgancilar, Asiatic Turkey.

References

Populated places in Bithynia
Former populated places in Turkey
Roman towns and cities in Turkey
History of Bilecik Province